The Ningbo–Dongguan Expressway, commonly referred to as the Yongguan Expressway, is an expressway in China that connects the cities of Ningbo, in the province of Zhejiang, and Dongguan, in the province of Guangdong. The expressway is a spur of the G15 Shenyang–Haikou Expressway which splits off from the G1504 Expressway at Ningbo and passes through the cities of Taizhou, Wenzhou, Fuzhou, and Xiamen before termainating at the G94 Expressway in Dongguan, Guangdong.

References

Chinese national-level expressways
Expressways in Fujian
Expressways in Guangdong
Expressways in Zhejiang